Nilacholey Kiriti is a Bengali, thriller drama film directed by Anindya Bikas Datta and produced by Rupa Datta. The film version is based on Basanta Rajani, the story of Kiriti Roy by Nihar Ranjan Gupta. This film was released on 9 February 2018 with the banner of Camellia Films Private Limited. It is a sequel to 2016 film Kiriti O Kalo Bhromor.

Plot
Newlyweds Kiriti Roy and Krishna go to Puri for their honeymoon. They attend a cultural programme in "Navrang Theatre" where they suddenly meet Kali Sarkar, Kiriti's childhood neighbour. He has taught him to play chess. Kali told that he had met with an accident in Puri. He also invites them on the next day in "Blue View", the hotel where he was staying. Kiriti was astonished why Kali was lying because the accident was happened in Kolkata and not in Puri. They also met a strange Sardarji who had a locket of "Lokenath Baba".

On next day the duo go to "Blue View" where they know that Kali had left the hotel on previous night. Kiriti meets the owner of the hotel, Runa Sanyal, from whom he came to know that a room is always booked for him. On the other hand, while waiting for Kiriti in the reception, Krishna notices a lady who was keeping a watch on them. They also meet the same Sardarji outside the hotel.

The couple visit Konark Sun Temple and Kiriti was narrating the history of the temple to Krishna. They meet a Chemistry professor there who has also an interest in history. He corrects a mistake of him while narrating. While returning, they meet Mr.Pattanayak, the O.C. of Puri. Kiriti hears that  a dead body is found on the sea beach. He was Sona Ali, a waiter of Blue View. He goes through the dead body and gets involved in the case. 

At the same night, someone comes to Kali's hotel room and searches something, which was noticed by Runa. Kiriti goes there on the next day and finds a scarf on the balcony. He also finds a diary of Kali where some movements of chess have been noted down. He also meets  Harit Sanyal, Runa's husband. He discovers that Kali had a lot of black money and so he used to come in Puri frequently. Kiriti returns to his room and starts analysing the diary. He discovers that there is a wrong movement have been written,"2 RMRJ 4.00". There is also mentioned about Alekhine's gun. Krishna informs that she had seen the lady of reception and the Sardarji. There is an interesting climax which denotes the complexity of relationships and a dark site of human beings.

Cast
 Indraneil Sengupta as Kiriti Roy
 Rituparna Sengupta as Runa Sanyal
 Arunima Ghosh as Krishna Roy
 Samadarshi Dutta as Subrata
 Shantilal Mukherjee as Harit Sanyal
 Abhishek Chatterjee as Kali Sarkar
 YourPritam as Raja 
 Suchandra Vaniya as Leena
 Rishabh as Ramanuj/Radha

See also 
 Kiriti O Kalo Bhromor
 Kiriti Roy (2016 film)

References

External links
  

2018 films
Bengali-language Indian films
2010s Bengali-language films
Indian thriller drama films
Indian detective films
Films based on Indian novels
2018 thriller films
Films based on works by Nihar Ranjan Gupta